Kaczka may refer to:

 Kaczka, Masovian Voivodeship
 IS-5 Kaczka a single-seat canard research glider
 Złota Kaczka ("Gold Duck"), a Polish award presented by the monthly film since 1956
 Złota kaczka ("Golden duck"), a legendary creature

People with the surname
 Krzysztof Kaczka
 Guido Kaczka (born 1978), an Argentine television show host, actor and producer

See also 

 Kaczor